The Bryn Oer Tramway (also known as the Brinore Tramroad) was a horse-worked narrow-gauge railway built in South Wales in 1814.

History 
The Brecknock and Abergavenny Canal was built under an Act of Parliament of 1793. The Bryn Oer Tramway was built under this act in 1814, opening in 1815. It was a horse-worked plateway that served the Bryn Oer collieries and the limestone quarries at Trefil, dropping  along its route to the canal at Talybont-on-Usk. An extension was built to serve the Rhymney ironworks in the Rhymney Valley.

By the 1830s, the growth of local railways had begun to complete with the tramway, especially with the introduction of steam locomotives that were too heavy to work on the fragile plateway. By 1860, most of the tramway's traffic was being sent by railways and it closed in 1865.

The tramway today 
Much of the route of the tramway is in use as a public bridleway for walkers, horseriders and mountain-bikers, and stone sleepers remain in place in several places.

A Brinore Tramroad Conservation Forum has been established to protect and conserve the remains of this important piece of Wales' industrial archaeology. The Forum comprises the Brecon Beacons National Park Authority, Natural Resources Wales, Tredegar Town Council, Talybont and Llangynidr community councils together with Llangynidr Historical Society and individuals.

See also
 British industrial narrow-gauge railways

References

External links
Brinore Tramroad Conservation Forum's site
images of Brinore Tramroad and surrounding area on Geograph website

3 ft 6 in gauge railways in Wales
Early Welsh railway companies
Industrial railways in Wales
Narrow gauge railways in Powys
Transport in Powys
Railway lines opened in 1815
Closed railway lines in Wales
History of Powys
Brecon Beacons
Rail trails in Wales
Footpaths in Powys
Railway lines closed in 1865
1815 establishments in Wales
Horse-drawn railways
Narrow gauge railways in Blaenau Gwent